Karl Adam may refer to:

Karl Adam (footballer) (1924–1999), German footballer 
Karl Adam (rowing coach) (1912–1976), German rowing coach
Karl Adam (theologian) (1876–1966), German Catholic theologian 
Karl Ferdinand Adam (1806–1868), German composer and music director

See also
Karl Adams (disambiguation)
Carl Adams (disambiguation)